Daria Widawska (born 1 May 1977 in Gdańsk, Poland) is a Polish actress.

Acting roles
 2018 : The Plagues of Breslau (as Magda Drewniak/Iwona Bogacka)
 2008-2009: 39 i pół (as Anna)
 2007 : Mamuśki (as Zyta)
 2007 : Hania (as the preceptress) 
 2006 : Hela w opałach (as Zofia)
 2006 : Faceci do wzięcia (as Basia Gołębiewska)
 2006 : Egzamin z życia (as Adrianna)
 2005 2007 : Magda M. (as Agata Bielecka)
 2005 : Klinika samotnych serc (as Monika)
 2004 : Na dobre i na złe (as Tomaszewska)
 2003 : Tygrysy Europy (as Karolcia)
 2003-2006 : Na Wspólnej (as receptionist)
 2003 : M jak miłość (as Beata)
 2000 : Twarze i maski (as the young actress)
 1999 : Tygrysy Europy (as Karolcia)

References

External links

Polish film actresses
1977 births
Living people
Actresses from Gdańsk
Polish television actresses